Pergarumi or Pirqa Rumi (possibly from Quechua pirqa wall, rumi stone) is a mountain in the northern part of the Cordillera Blanca in the Andes of Peru which reaches a height of approximately . It is located in the Ancash Region, Huaylas Province, Santa Cruz District. Pergarumi lies northwest of Santa Cruz, south of the lakes Atuncocha and Rajucocha.

Sources

Mountains of Peru
Mountains of Ancash Region